Balangir also known as Bolangir, is a city and municipality, the headquarters of Balangir district in the state of Odisha, India. Balangir has one of the best cultural heritage in India. It is also known as one of the finest places for tourists in  Odisha. Balangir municipality is divided into twenty-one wards.

Geography
It has an average elevation of 383 metres (800 feet) above sea level.

People from Balangir
Rajendra Narayan Singh Deo, Former Chief Minister of Odisha
Srinibash Udgata, Eminent Poet awarded Padma Shri by Government of India
Kailash Chandra Meher, Eminent Artist awarded Padma Shri by Government of India
Narasingha Mishra, Eminent Lawyer Twelfth Law Commission of Government Of India
Rasanara Parwin is a cricket player of India women's national cricket team.
Sam Pitroda, telecom engineer, inventor, entrepreneur and policymaker.

Transport

Airport
The Jharsuguda Airport at Jharsuguda is the nearest airport to the city while Swami Vivekananda Airport at Raipur, Chhattisgarh is 234 km away. Biju Patnaik International Airport in the state capital, Bhubaneswar is 327 km away by road and 397 km by rail.

Railway Station
Balangir Junction railway station on the Jharsuguda-Sambalpur-Titlagarh railway line of East Coast Railways is the city's railway link to the national railway network.

Highway
Bolangir is connected by road to the state capital Bhubaneswar which is 327 km to the east.

Politics
Current MLA from Bolangir Assembly Constituency is Narasingha Mishra of Indian National Congress, who won the seat in State elections of 2014 by defeating BJD stalwart Ananga Udaya Singh Deo.

Bolangir is part of Bolangir (Lok Sabha constituency).

Culture

The Nuakhai 
The "Nuakhai" is a social festival of unity. This festival is observed among kith and kins during the month of Bhadraba. The appropriate date of the Nuakhai is just the day after the Ganesh Puja. It is a festival of harvest of crops. On this occasion, the new grain after harvesting is first offered to the local deity and during this festival, the people get themselves lost in merrymakings. Wearing new clothes, preparing delicious foods the people of this area celebrate this festival with enthusiasm. It is mostly an agricultural festival of Western Odisha. It can also be dubbed as The 'Baisakhi' of Odisha.

Ratha Jatra, The Chariot Festival 
In the Ratha Yatra, the three deities are taken from the Jagannath Temple in the chariots to the 'Mausi Mandira' or Gundicha Temple, where they stay for nine days. Thereafter, the deities again ride the chariots back to Shri Mandir in bahuda jatra. On the way back, the three chariots halt at the Mausi Maa Temple and the deities are offered Poda Pitha, a kind of baked cake which are generally consumed by the people of Odisha.

Ratha Yatra is a journey in a chariot accompanied by the public. It typically refers to a procession (journey) of deities, people dressed like deities, or simply religious saints and political leaders.

Religion

Hinduism 
Pataneswari

Tourist Attractions

Gandhamardan Hills 
Gandhamardan Hills or Gandhamardan Parbat (Odia: ଗନ୍ଧମାର୍ଦନ ପର୍ବତ) is a hill located in between Balangir and Bargarh district of Odisha, India. This hill is well known for medicinal plants. Lord Hanuman is believed to reside here and in the Piduru Mountains in Sri Lanka.

The Botanical Survey of India has reported the existence of 220 plant species of medicinal value. Local people, however, claim that there are more than 500 species of medicinal plants in this area. The flora of the buffer zone is most vulnerable.

Harishankar Temple 
Sri Sri Harisankar Devasthana is a temple on the slopes of Gandhamardhan hills, Bolangir District of Odisha in India. It is popular for its scenes of nature and connection to two Hindu lords, Vishnu and Shiva. As a holy place, along with a stream passing on the granite bed, it has given some visitors a feeling of peace. On the opposite of side of the Gandhamardhan hills is the temple of Nrusinghanath. The plateau between the two temples has been found to have ancient Buddhist ruins, which are considered to be remnants of the ancient Parimalgiri University.

Ranipur Jharial 
It is a historical destination, near Titilagarh. An Ancient, roundabout like temple preserves the history of Ranipur-Jharial with its rocky terrain, It also has an attractive pond.

Climate

References

External links
 Govt. Of Odisha Website
 Odisha Tourism
 Official website of Balangir

 
Cities and towns in Bolangir district
Former capital cities in India